State of the Union is a British comedy television series that premiered on 6 May 2019 on Sundance TV. It is written by Nick Hornby and directed by Stephen Frears.

The second season premiered in February 2022.

Premise
Season 1 of State of the Union follows "Louise and Tom, played by Pike and O’Dowd, who meet in a pub immediately before their weekly marital therapy session. Each episode pieces together how their lives were, what drew them together, and what has started to pull them apart."

Cast and Characters

Season 1
Rosamund Pike as Louise
Chris O'Dowd as Tom

Season 2

Brendan Gleeson as Scott
Patricia Clarkson as Ellen
Esco Jouley as Jay

Episodes

Series overview

Season 1 (2019)

Season 2 (2022)

Production

Development
On 13 July 2018, it was announced that Sundance TV had given the production a series order consisting of ten episodes running around ten minutes each. The series was expected to be written by Nick Hornby and directed by Stephen Frears, both of whom were set to be executive producers. Production companies involved with the series included See-Saw Films.

Series 1

Casting
Alongside the series order announcement, it was confirmed that Rosamund Pike and Chris O'Dowd had been cast in the series' lead roles for season 1.

Filming
Principal photography for the series was scheduled to begin in the summer of 2018 in London, England. The pub used for the series was the Thatched House in Hammersmith, London W6.

Soundtrack
Roger Eno scored the soundtrack, which was performed by jazz musicians Jack Pinter, Sebastian Rochford (drums) and Steve Watts on saxophone and recorded at AIR Studios in London, according to the trailer.

Series 2
On 25 January 2021 the series was renewed for a second season, starring Brendan Gleeson, Patricia Clarkson and Esco Jouléy.

Release

Marketing
On 10 October 2018, a "first-look" image from the series was released.

Premiere
On 28 January 2019, the series received its world premiere during the 2019 Sundance Film Festival.

Reception
In a positive review, Varietys Daniel D'Addario praised the series saying, "State of the Union pulls off a neat trick; given both its short running time and its fleetness of dialogue, we never get tired of hearing this couple's arguments, which could in other contexts be tiresome and circular." In another encouraging criticism, The Hollywood Reporters Daniel Fienberg described the series as a "clever and beautifully acted piece" and  declared that "Stephen Frears and Nick Hornby's perceptive two-hander is still well worth seeing."

Awards and nominations

References

External links
 
 
 

2019 British television series debuts
2010s British comedy television series
2020s British comedy television series
English-language television shows
Primetime Emmy Award-winning television series
Sundance TV original programming